Sudden Fiction is the third album by Dan Michaelson aka Dan Michaelson and The Coastguards and was released by indie label Editions in 2011.

Track listing

References

2011 albums